Denis Damirovich Saifutdinov (born 2 June 1981) is a Russian motorcycle speedway rider who rode in the 2002 Speedway World Cup for Russia.

Saifutdinov was born into a Tatar family. His parents are Damir and Tamara; his brother, Emil Saifutdinov (born 1989) is also a speedway rider. Emil is a current member of Russia's national team, who won the Individual Speedway Junior World Championship in 2007 and 2008.

Denis Saifutdinov was 15th in the 2002 Individual Speedway Junior World Championship and scored 2 points.

See also
 Russia national speedway team

References

External links
(ru)Denis&Emil Sayfutdinov Website 

1981 births
Living people
Tatar people of Russia
Russian speedway riders